Augusta Webster (30 January 1837 – 5 September 1894) born in Poole, Dorset as Julia Augusta Davies, was an English poet, dramatist, essayist, and translator.

Biography
Augusta was the daughter of Vice-admiral George Davies and Julia Hume, she spent her younger years on board the ship he was stationed, the Griper.

She studied Greek at home, taking a particular interest in Greek drama, and went on to study at the Cambridge School of Art. She published her first volume of poetry in 1860 under the pen name Cecil Homes.
In 1863, she married Thomas Webster, a fellow at Trinity College, Cambridge. They had a daughter, Augusta Georgiana, who married Reverend George Theobald Bourke, a younger son of the Joseph Bourke, 3rd Earl of Mayo.

Much of Webster's writing explored the condition of women, and she was a strong advocate of women's right to vote, working for the London branch of the National Committee for Women's Suffrage. She was the first female writer to hold elective office, having been elected to the London School Board in 1879 and 1885.<ref>Papaioannou, Nicole. But They Would Not Teach Her to Play': Child Heroines, Fantasy, and the Victorian Debate on Female Education (Master's thesis)]. Montclair State University: Montclair, NJ</ref> In 1885 she travelled to Italy in an attempt to improve her failing health. She died on 5 September 1894, aged 57.

During her lifetime her writing was acclaimed and she was considered by some the successor to Elizabeth Barrett Browning. After her death, however, her reputation quickly declined. Since the mid-1990s she has gained increasing critical attention from scholars such as Isobel Armstrong, Angela Leighton, and Christine Sutphin. Her best-known poems include three long dramatic monologues spoken by women: A Castaway, Circe, and The Happiest Girl In The World, as well as a posthumously published sonnet-sequence, "Mother and Daughter".

She died on the 5th September 1894 and was buried on the western side of Highgate Cemetery. Her grave (plot no.8187), which is situated above the cuttings catacombs, has suffered badly from tree roots.

Literary works
Poetry
 Blanche Lisle: And Other Poems. 1860
 Lilian Gray. 1864 
 Dramatic Studies. 1866
 A Woman Sold and Other Poems. 1867
 Portraits 1870
 A Book of Rhyme 1881
 Mother and Daughter 1895 

Translations into verse
 Prometheus Bound 1866
 Medea 1868
 Yu-Pe-Ya's Lute. A Chinese Tale in English Verse. 1874

Plays
 The Auspicious Day 1874
 Disguises 1879
 In a Day 1882
 The Sentence 1887

Novels
 Lesley's Guardians 1864Daffodil and the Croaxaxicans: A Romance of History 1884

Essays
 A Housewife's Opinions 1878 

References

Sources
Crawford, Elizabeth. The Women's Suffrage Movement in Britain and Ireland: A Regional Survey.'' Women's and gender history. London: Routledge, 2006. [https://books.google.com/books?id=eIzLissZmscC&pg=PA703&dq=Housewife%27s%2BOpinions%27%27+webster+suffrage&sig=ACfU3U2aO4OUC__kKiCUWZveietHb97o-A googlebooks Accessed 27 September 2008

External links
 

1837 births
1894 deaths
Burials at Highgate Cemetery
People from Poole
English women poets
Members of the London School Board
19th-century English poets
19th-century English women writers
19th-century British writers